Lukas Kačavenda (born 2 March 2003) is a Croatian professional footballer who plays as a midfielder for Prva HNL side Lokomotiva Zagreb.

Club career 
Kačavenda was born in Zagreb, where his father hails from, while his mother hails from Sisak. He started playing football by joining the local club Kustošija. In 2015, he moved to the academy of the Croatian giants Dinamo Zagreb which he left two years later, unsatisfied with his playing time. He then joined Lokomotiva.

During the March international break in 2021, Lokomotiva played a friendly game with Orijent 1919 and the coach Samir Toplak called up several youth players to join the senior team. Toplak was impressed by Kačavenda and Luka Stojković and left them in the senior team permanently. Kačavenda made his debut on 3 April in a 2–0 defeat to Hajduk Split, coming on for Kim Jeong Hyun in the 65th minute. On 7 May, he provided Roko Šimić with an assist for the first goal and scored the second himself, as Lokomotiva defeated Slaven Belupo 3–1. He was credited as one of the key players who helped Lokomotiva preserve their first league status.

International career 
Kačavenda was not part of Croatia's youth teams until autumn 2021, when he was called up to Croatia under-21 national team by their coach Igor Bišćan for the upcoming UEFA Under-21 Euro 2023 qualifying, quickly establishing himself as a key player as Croatia finished the year with six victories out of six.

Career statistics

References

External links 

2003 births
Living people
Footballers from Zagreb
Association football midfielders
Croatian footballers
Croatia youth international footballers
Croatia under-21 international footballers
NK Lokomotiva Zagreb players
Croatian Football League players